Contarinia cerasiserotinae is a species of gall midge in the family Cecidomyiidae.

References

Further reading

 
 

Cecidomyiinae
Articles created by Qbugbot
Insects described in 1871
Gall-inducing insects

Taxa named by Carl Robert Osten-Sacken